Psilogramma danneri is a moth of the family Sphingidae. It is known from Uttar Pradesh in India.

References

Psilogramma
Moths described in 2001
Endemic fauna of India